
West Hill may refer to:

Canada
 West Hill, Toronto, a neighbourhood in the east of the city

England
 West Hill, Brighton, East Sussex
 West Hill, Devon
 West Hill, Dorset
 West Hill, East Riding of Yorkshire, a location
 West Hill, Hastings, a location
 West Hill, London
 West Hill, Kirknewton, Northumberland
 West Hill, North Somerset, a location in Somerset
 West Hill, South Somerset, a location in Somerset
 West Hill, Staffordshire, a location
 West Hill, West Sussex, a location
 West Hill, Wiltshire
 West Hill School, Stalybridge, Greater Manchester

India
 West Hill railway station, Kozhikode District, Kerala

Scotland
 Craig Leith (hill), also known as West Hill, in the Ochil Hills

United States
West Hill Historic District (West Hartford, Connecticut), listed on the NRHP in Connecticut
West Hill (Lumpkin, Georgia), listed on the NRHP in Georgia
West Hill Historic District (Muscatine, Iowa), listed on the NRHP in Iowa
West Hill (Hamilton County, New York), a summit
West Hill, Ohio
West Hill, Pennsylvania

See also
West Hill Historic District (disambiguation)
West Hills (disambiguation)